Faramarz Gharibian (born 18 November 1941) is an Iranian retired actor. He won three Crystal Simorgh Awards for his performances in The Train (1988), Misty Harbour (1992), and The Rain Man (1998).

Career 
He learned film acting in the School of Visual Arts, US (1971). He started his career with a short role in Come Stranger (1968, Masoud Kimiai). His professional debut was in Soil (1973, Masoud Kimiai).

In most of his films, he plays the role of a resolute man who, in order to achieve his goals or preserve his ideals, must face conflict and danger. He has some adventure films in his career and also directed three feature films, Duel in Tasuki (1986), Law (1995) and Her Eyes (1999).  Gharibian has been nominated for the prize of Best Actor, and has won the prize for Train (1987), Misty Harbor (1992) and The Rain Man (1999) from Fajr International Film Festival.

In recent years, he has won international awards from around the world.  He won the award for Best Actor at the 25th Moscow International Film Festival and Asia Pacific Film Festival for Dancing in the Dust, he also won the Special Jury Prize in the International Film Festival of India for The Beautiful City.

Filmography 
 The Deers, 1974
 Ghazal, 1975
 Jong-e Athar, 1977
 The Tall Shadows of the Wind, 1977
 The Messenger, 1981
 Kani-Manga, 1986
 The Train, 1987
 The Wolf’s Trail, 1991
 Misty Harbour, 1992
 I Want to Live, 1994
 The Rain Man, 1998
 Dancing in the Dust, 2002
 Beautiful City, 2005
 The Wet Dream, 2005
 The Forbidden Chapter, 2006
 The Boss, 2007
 Alzheimer (2011)
 Exodus (2020)

References

External links 
 

1941 births
Living people
People from Tehran
Iranian male actors
Iranian film directors
Male actors from Tehran
Iranian male film actors
Iranian male television actors
Crystal Simorgh for Best Actor winners